Ross Parker (born 27 January 1949) is  a former Australian rules footballer who played with Fitzroy in the Victorian Football League (VFL).

Notes

External links 
		

Living people
1949 births
Australian rules footballers from Victoria (Australia)
Fitzroy Football Club players